Alopoglossus eurylepis, the largescale lizard, is a species of lizard in the family Alopoglossidae. It is endemic to Colombia.

References

Alopoglossus
Reptiles of Colombia
Endemic fauna of Colombia
Reptiles described in 1985
Taxa named by Dennis M. Harris
Taxa named by José Vicente Rueda Almonacid
Taxobox binomials not recognized by IUCN